PHY is an abbreviation for the physical layer of the OSI model and refers to the circuitry required to implement physical layer functions.

PHY or Phy may also refer to:

 Phy, the drug methadone
 Phetchabun Airport (IATA code), Thailand

See also 
Physics